Halit Refiğ (5 March 1934 – 11 October 2009) was a Turkish film director, film producer, screenwriter and writer. He made around sixty films, including feature films, documentaries and TV serials. He is considered to be the pioneer of the National Cinema movement and the initiator of the production of TV serials in Turkey.

Biography
Halit Refiğ graduated from Şişli Terakki High School in 1951 and studied engineering at Robert College in Istanbul.

Refiğ directed his first films in 8mm while he served as a military reserve officer in Korea, Japan and Ceylon. He wrote articles on cinema at newspapers in 1956 and published the Sinema Dergisi magazine together with Nijat Özön. He began his career as Atıf Yılmaz's assistant in 1957 together with Yılmaz Güney. He worked as scriptwriter for Atıf Yılmaz and Memduh Ün. His directorial debut was Forbidden Love (Yasak Aşk) (1961). His 1962 film Stranger in the City was entered into the 3rd Moscow International Film Festival.

In the 1970s, with the decline in Turkish cinema, he started to work extensively for TV. In 1974, he contributed as an instructor to the first cinema education programs initiated by the Istanbul State Fine Arts Academy (the Mimar Sinan Fine Arts University of today) where he started to work as lecturer in 1975. In 1975, he directed the TV series Aşk-ı Memnu (Forbidden Love) which was aired on the Turkish Radio Television, TRT. This TV serial is considered to be the first miniseries on Turkish television stations. In 1978, he wrote a script for a documentary about the life of Mimar Sinan on commission from the Mimar Sinan University. The project was not completed but the script was published.

In 1999, on commission from the then Prime Minister Bülent Ecevit, he began developing a feature film project titled Devlet Ana (Mother State), to be released on the 700th anniversary of the establishment of the Ottoman Empire. The project was going to be conducted in collaboration with the Mimar Sinan University (MSU). In 2001, Refiğ stated that he will not collaborate with MSU and thus the project was not realized.

Censorship
Refiğ's 1979-81 adaptation of Kemal Tahir's novel, Yorgun Savaşçı, for TRT, where he served as an advisor, was banned from broadcast by TRT on accounts of incorporating scenes which were anti-Atatürk, anti-Turkish Independence War, and pro-Çerkes Ethem. A commission of seven people comprising three colonels, a representative of the Ministry of Interior, a representative of the press office of the Prime Minister, two TRT representatives, and Turgut Özakman, the director of the Turkish State Theatres, representing the Ministry of Culture, was formed on order from President Kenan Evren and Prime Minister Bülent Ulusu and the prints were burnt in 1983 by TRT director Macit Akman, at the furnaces of the Turkish General Staff printhouse under the supervision of the said commission. This censorship caused public controversy. A surviving copy surfaced in 1993 and the 8-episode miniseries was broadcast in its entirety on TRT.

Academic life
He lectured at the University of Wisconsin in 1976, where he directed The Intercessors, and at Denison University in Ohio in 1984, where he shot In the Wilderness with his students. He was given the title of "Honorary Professor" by Marmara University in 1997.

Death
He suffered from cholangiocarcinoma and died on 11 October 2009 in Istanbul, aged 75. He was interred in the Zincirlikuyu Cemetery two days later, following the funeral service held at Teşvikiye Mosque.

Filmography as director

 Seviştiğimiz Günler (1961)
 Yasak Aşk (1961)
 Şehirdeki Yabancı (1962)
 Gençlik Hülyaları (1962)
 Şafak Bekçileri (1963)
 Gurbet Kuşları (1964)
 Şehrazat (1964)
 Evcilik Oyunu (1964)
 İstanbul'un Kızları (1964)
 Canım Sana Feda (1965)
 Güneşe Giden Yol (1965)
 Haremde Dört Kadın (1965)
 Kırık Hayatlar (1965)
 Erkek Ve Dişi (1966)
 Üç Korkusuz Arkadaş (1966)
 Karakolda Ayna Var (1966)
 Can Yoldaşları (1966)
 Kız Kolunda Damga Var (1967)
 Bir Türk'e Gönül Verdim (1969)
 Yaşamak Ne Güzel Şey (1969)
 Adsız Cengaver (1970)
 Sevmek Ve Ölmek Zamanı (1971)
 Ali Cengiz Oyunu (1971)
 Çöl Kartalı (1972)
 Acı Zafer (1972)
 Aşk Fırtınası (1972)
 Fatma Bacı (1972)
 Kızın Varmı Derdin Var (1973)
 Cennetin Kapısı (1973)
 Sultan Gelin (1973)
 Vurun Kahpeye (1973)
 Yedi Evlat İki Damat (1973)
 Aşk-ı Memnu (1975) (TV)
 Arabulucular (1977)
 Yaşam Kavgası (1978)
 Yorgun Savaşçı (1979) (TV)
 Leyla İle Mecnun (1982)
 O Kadın (1982)
 Beyaz Ölüm (1983)
 İhtiras Fırtınası (1983)
 Alev Alev (1984)
 Ölüm Yolu (1985)
 Paramparça (1985)
 Son Darbe (1985)
 Kıskıvrak (1986)
 Teyzem (1986)
 Yarın Ağlayacağım (1986)
 Kızımın Kanı (1987)
 Kurtar Beni (1987)
 Kızım Ve Ben (1988)
 Hanım (1988)
 Karılar Koğuşu (1989)
 İki Yabancı (1990)
 Zirvedekiler (1993) (TV)
 Köpekler Adası (1996)
 Affet Bizi Hocam (1998) (TV)
 Kerem (1999)
 Affet Beni Hocam (2000) 
 Zeynep Öğretmen (2000) (TV)
 Gelinlik Kız (2000)
 Sara ile Musa (2000) (TV)
 Midasın Düşü (2000) (TV)
 Gençlik (2000)

Producer
 Yaşamak Hakkımdır 1958
 İstanbul'un Kızları 1964
 Canım Sana Feda 1965
 İki Yabancı 1990

Screenwriter

References

External links
 Biography of Halit Refiğ

Bibliography

Published screenplays
Refiğ, Halit. (2009). Puşkin Erzurumda. Dergah Yayınları, Sinema İletişim Dizisi, İstanbul. 
Refiğ, Halit. (2009). Koca Sinan. Dergah Yayınları, Sinema İletişim Dizisi, İstanbul. 
Refiğ, Halit. (2009). Şeytan Aldatması. Alfa Basım Yayım Dağıtım, Senaryo Dizisi, İstanbul. 
Refiğ, Halit. (2009). Gazi ile Latife: Mustafa Kemal'in Yaşamından Bir Kesit. Alfa Basım Yayım Dağıtım, Senaryo Dizisi, İstanbul. 
Refiğ, Halit. (2006).  Aşk ve Ölüm Senaryoları. Doğan Kitapçılık, İstanbul.

Non-fiction (memoirs, essays)
Refiğ, Halit; eds. Gültekin, D. Ali; Zileli, Irmak. (2009). Doğruyu Aradım Güzeli Sevdim. Bizim Kitaplar Yayınevi, İstanbul. 
Refiğ, Halit; ed. Gültekin, D. Ali. (2007). Tek Umut Türkiye. Bizim Kitaplar Yayınevi, İstanbul. 
Refiğ, Halit & Hristidis, Şengün Kılıç. (2007). Sinemada Ulusal Tavır. Türkiye İş Bankası Kültür Yayınları, İstanbul. 
Refiğ, Halit. (2002).  Doğu Batı ve Türkiye 10 Yılda Nereden Başladık? Nereye Geldik?. Ufuk Kitapları, İstanbul. 
Refiğ, Halit. (2000). Gerçeğin Değişkenliği Kemal Tahir. Ufuk Kitapları, İstanbul.

Further reading
Maraşlı, Gülşah Nezaket. (2007). Bir Halit Refiğ Filmi. Elips Kitap, İstanbul. 
Adiloğlu, Fatoş. (2006). Sinemada Mimari Açılımlar: Halit Refiğ Filmleri. Es Yayınları, İstanbul. 
Türk, İbrahim. (2001). Halit Refiğ Düşlerden Düşüncelere Söyleşiler. Kabalcı Yayınları, İstanbul. 

1934 births
2009 deaths
Best Director Golden Orange Award winners
Burials at Zincirlikuyu Cemetery
Deaths from cancer in Turkey
Film people from Istanbul
People from İzmir
Robert College alumni
Turkish film directors
Turkish film producers
Turkish male screenwriters
Deaths from cholangiocarcinoma
20th-century Turkish screenwriters